Seychelles is divided into 26 districts. All but one are located on the Inner Islands; the Outer Islands (Zil Elwannyen Sesel) make up the most recent district. Eight districts make up Greater Victoria, 14 make up the rural part of the main island of Mahé, two make up Praslin, and one makes up La Digue (which includes small surrounding islands and some distant islands like Silhouette, North Island, Denis, Bird).

The capital city of Victoria consists of three districts: English River, Saint Louis and Mont Fleuri.

Between 1991 and 1993, the original 23 districts were local government units with elected councils. Since then, they have been governed by government-appointed administrators.

In 1998, two new districts (Roche Caiman and Les Mamelles) were created mostly from reclaimed land and from parts of Plaisance. In 2012, another new land reclamation took place, adding Eve Island and Rev Island near the capital Victoria and Bay St. Anne in Praslin, making the area 459 km2. Also, the Outer Islands were given district status by the ministry of tourism.

Table of districts

See also
ISO 3166-2:SC

References

Notes

External links

District Map
Current District Population Statistics
District Statistics, with area figures
Regions of Mahé
Coats of Arms of Seychelles Districts

 
Subdivisions of Seychelles
Seychelles, Districts
Seychelles 1
Districts, Seychelles
Seychelles geography-related lists